Turner Brothers' Building–American Household Storage Company is a historic manufacturing and warehouse building located at Buffalo in Erie County, New York. The original section was built about 1848, and it is a four-story, wood frame, brick faced building in the Gothic Revival style.  A six-story, two bay reinforced concrete addition was built in 1910.  The building has three-story rear additions built in 1889 and 1940.

It was listed on the National Register of Historic Places in 2013.

References

External links
Buffalo Rising: Schneider Development unveils $11.4 million Turner Brothers Lofts, June 7, 2016

Industrial buildings and structures on the National Register of Historic Places in New York (state)
Gothic Revival architecture in New York (state)
Industrial buildings completed in 1848
Buildings and structures in Buffalo, New York
National Register of Historic Places in Buffalo, New York